Domino is a 2019 crime thriller film directed by Brian De Palma and starring Nikolaj Coster-Waldau, Carice van Houten, Guy Pearce, and Eriq Ebouaney. It was an international co-production filmed on-location in locations across Europe, including Denmark, Belgium, Spain, and Italy. It tells the story of a Danish police officer (Coster-Waldau) who is seeking justice for the murder of his partner by a vengeful man (Ebouaney), hampered by the fact that his target is a CIA informant.

In the United States, it was released direct-to-VOD on May 31, 2019, by Saban Films, but received theatrical releases in other territories. It received generally negative reviews. De Palma has expressed discontentment with the final film, revealing in interviews that due to production issues, considerable sections of the original script were not filmed as intended.

Plot
Copenhagen police officers Christian Toft and Lars Hansen are sent to check out a reported domestic disturbance in an apartment. When they arrive, they find a man trying to leave the building with blood on his shoes. Toft assumes he’s the domestic assailant and handcuffs him. Hansen sends Toft upstairs to go check on the man’s wife, when Toft realizes he accidentally left his gun at home. He takes Hansen’s and goes upstairs, only to find the apartment filled with firearms, plastic explosives, and a man lying dead with his throat slit and fingers removed. Using a hidden knife, the assailant breaks free from his restraints and attacks Hansen, inadvertently cutting his throat. The wounded Hansen tells Toft to give chase before losing consciousness. Toft pursues the assailant across the rooftop, but both fall several stories. While Toft lies incapacitated, he sees three men come up and knock the assailant out before taking him away.

The police identify the assailant from fingerprints as Ezra Tarzi, a Libyan emigrant and former Special Forces operative whose parents had been killed by Salah Al-Din, an ISIS commander known as “Sheikh”. Al-Din, who smuggles weapons and explosives through a tomato importer based in Brussels, is responsible for numerous terrorist attacks which he films and edits before posting them online. Tarzi’s victim, Farooq Hares, was one of Al-Din’s lieutenants, and Tarzi was trying to get to him. Toft wants to pursue Tarzi to bring him to justice, but is suspended by his superior Detective Wold after he learns that Toft misplaced his service weapon, and is interrogated by internal affairs inspector Alex Boe.

Meanwhile, Tarzi and his family have been abducted by CIA agent Joe Martin, who has relentlessly pursued Al-Din ever since he killed five of his colleagues years earlier. Martin pressures a reluctant Tarzi into working on his behalf by threatening to reveal his murderous deeds to his children. He sends him first after Hares’ nephew in Copenhagen, but during the struggle the younger Hares breaks loose and throws himself to his death. Tarzi manages to find several hidden cellphones in the apartment, from which Martin traces calls from a restaurant in Almería. They deduce that Al-Din intends to use a ferry to escape to friendly territory in North Africa, where he’ll be effectively untraceable. Tarzi travels to Almería and attempts to find Al-Din by torturing one of his underlings, but gets nothing.

Despite being suspended, Toft remains resolute in finding Tarzi. Along with Boe, who also wants to avenge Hansen, the two travel unsupervised to Brussels, but during the drive receive a phone call from Hansen’s wife Hanne that he has died in hospice. Heartbroken, Alex reveals that she and Lars had been having an affair and he’d been intending to divorce Hanne and start a family with her. When a shocked Toft pushes back, Boe reveals intimate photos of the two together and an ultrasound, indicating she's carrying his child.

The two fail to find leads in Brussels, but learn that Tarzi has been spotted in Almería and quickly change course for southern Spain. As they’re driving from the airport, they spot one of Al-Din’s tomato delivery trucks, and Toft deduces the connection. They follow the truck, eventually stumbling across Al-Din himself in another. They follow him to a bullfighting area, where he and several others splinter off into the ring and nearby building. Toft follows Al-Din to the roof of the building, while Boe follows the others into the arena, where she spots one of them causing a distraction while another gets into a strategic location. Al-Din’s men fly a camera drone into the arena, intending to film their comrade’s suicide bombing. Just in the nick of time, Toft and Boe realize what is happening and intervene, shooting Al-Din in the process.

Boe calls Wold, who in turn calls Martin, who proposes a trade - Tarzi for Al-Din. They meet on the rooftop, but Al-Din dies from his wounds. A distraught Tarzi asks Toft to kill him, but Martin makes clear that he intends to use the vengeful assassin as an asset for years to come. Suddenly, Boe arrives and shoots and kills Tarzi, avenging Lars. A disappointed Martin walks away, leaving an emotionally-drained Toft and Boe alone.

Cast

 Nikolaj Coster-Waldau as Christian Toft
 Carice van Houten as Alex Boe
 Guy Pearce as Joe Martin
 Eriq Ebouaney as Ezra Tarzi
 Thomas W. Gabrielsson as Chief Detective Wold
 Paprika Steen as Hanne Hansen
 Illias Adabb as Yusuf Hares
 Mohammed Azaay as Salah Al-Din
 Søren Malling as Lars Hansen
 Jay Pothof as Musa Tarzi
 Ardalan Esmailli as Omar
 Sachli Gholamalizad as Fatima
 Hamid Krim as Mustafa
 Younes Bachira as Miguel
 Emrin Dalgic as Farooq Hares
 Nicolas Bro as Hospital Porter

Production
In 2017, Brian De Palma began to shoot Domino in Málaga, and continued in Almería at the airport, the bullring and the port. Walk-on extras were selected at the Estadio de los Juegos Mediterráneos. Shooting in the Almería bullring was cut short due to problems with the number of extras required. Christina Hendricks was replaced by Carice van Houten in the lead female role. When shooting finished in Spain, De Palma moved on to continue in Denmark.

Despite De Palma denying rumors that the final cut, clocking in at 89 minutes, was shortened against his wishes (an erroneous original running time of 148 minutes had been cited by reviewers), he declared: "I was not involved in the ADR, the musical recording sessions, the final mix or the color timing of the final print." In an interview with theplaylist.net he precised: "Domino is not my project, I did not write the script [...]. I had a lot of problems in financing [it]. I never experienced such a horrible movie set. A large part of our team has not even been paid yet by the Danish producers. [...] This was my first experience in Denmark and most likely my last."

Release
The film was released on May 31, 2019.

Reception

Box office
Domino grossed $426,238.

Critical response
The website's critical consensus reads, "A rote thriller whose few flourishes serve as bittersweet reminders of its director's glory days, Domino continues a streak of DePalma disappointments." On Metacritic the film has a weighted average score of 40 out of 100, based on 20 critics, indicating "mixed or average reviews".

Benjamin Lee of The Guardian gave the film 1 out of 5 stars, writing, "What's most frustrating about Domino is just how invisible De Palma has become, bringing a tired script to screen without any real panache or even effort, the work of a man who's seemingly given up." 
David Fear of Rolling Stone gave the film 2.5 out of 5 stars, describing it as "A messy, uneven, heavy-handed, occasionally inspired, often insipid, steroidally stylistic De Palma joint, but one that fits the description in enough fits and starts to warrant the claim." 
Peter Sobcynzki of RogerEbert.com gave the film 3.5 out of 4 stars, writing, "This is not a great Brian De Palma film in the end, but its best moments will remind you of just how great he can be."

References

External links
 
 Official website (in Japanese)
 
 
 Domino at Box Office Mojo

2019 films
2010s English-language films
English-language Belgian films
Belgian crime thriller films
English-language Danish films
Danish crime thriller films
English-language Dutch films
Dutch crime thriller films
English-language French films
French crime thriller films
English-language Italian films
Italian crime thriller films
Films directed by Brian De Palma
Films scored by Pino Donaggio
Films about terrorism in Europe
Films set in 2020
Films set in Amsterdam
Films set in Andalusia
Films set in Brussels
Films set in Copenhagen
Films shot in Denmark
Films shot in Antwerp
Films shot in Sardinia
Films shot in Almería
Films shot in Amsterdam
Saban Films films
2010s French films